Captain Marvelous may refer to:

 A comic book character from the 1979 Australian television soap opera Prisoner
 Captain Marvelous (Gokaiger), the main protagonist of the 2011 Super Sentai series Kaizoku Sentai Gokaiger